Mitchell is a town in Glascock County, Georgia, United States. The population was 199 at the 2010 census. Mitchell is home to the Mitchell Depot Historical Museum.

History
Mitchell had its start in the 1880s, when the railroad was extended to that point. The community was named after R. M. Mitchell, a railroad official.

The Georgia General Assembly incorporated Mitchell as a town in 1896.

Geography

Mitchell is located in western Glascock County at the intersection of State Routes 102 and 123. SR 102 leads east  to Gibson, the Glascock County seat, and southwest  to Sandersville, while SR 123 leads northwest  to Sparta.

Demographics

As of the census of 2000, there were 173 people, 72 households, and 51 families residing in the town. The racial makeup of the town was 83.82% White and 16.18% African American.

There were 72 households, out of which 26.4% had children under the age of 18 living with them, 62.5% were married couples living together, 5.6% had a female householder with no husband present, and 27.8% were non-families. 26.4% of all households were made up of individuals, and 12.5% had someone living alone who was 65 years of age or older. The average household size was 2.40 and the average family size was 2.90.

In the town, the population was spread out, with 19.1% under the age of 18, 6.9% from 18 to 24, 25.4% from 25 to 44, 27.7% from 45 to 64, and 20.8% who were 65 years of age or older. The median age was 43 years. For every 100 females, there were 98.9 males. For every 100 females age 18 and over, there were 94.4 males.

The median income for a household in the town was $34,375, and the median income for a family was $44,063. Males had a median income of $35,000 versus $21,875 for females. The per capita income for the town was $18,103. About 2.9% of families and 7.8% of the population were below the poverty line, including 12.5% of those under the age of eighteen and 6.7% of those 65 or over.

See also

Central Savannah River Area

References

External links
 The News and Farmer and Wadley Herald/ Jefferson Reporter, the county's weekly newspaper and the oldest weekly newspaper in Georgia.

Towns in Glascock County, Georgia
Towns in Georgia (U.S. state)